Jerry Riopelle (May 5, 1941 – December 24, 2018) was an American singer-songwriter, musician and record producer born in Detroit, and raised in Tampa, Florida, and known primarily for his hard rock performances and for his record production. He mixed rock, country and jazz with R&B and was an inductee into the Arizona Music and Entertainment Hall of Fame.

Early career
Riopelle began his music career in the 1960s in Los Angeles working as an independent record producer.  He played drums for The Hollywood Argyles and later signed with Screen Gems as a staff songwriter. At Screen Gems, he wrote and produced, along with Clydie King, a single called "The Thrill is Gone" (not to be confused with the one made famous by B.B. King).  This exposure helped Riopelle land staff writer and producer job with Phil Spector and Lester Sills label Philles Records.

Riopelle had his first charting record as producer of "Home of the Brave," which was recorded by Bonnie & The Treasures reached #77 on the Billboard Hot 100 in the summer of 1965. He later produced top 40 singles for The Parade (he was a member) and April Stevens & Nino Tempo.  This led to an opportunity to work as an A&M Records producer and a role as a staff writer at Irving Music.

Later career and death
Riopelle produced and wrote for The Parade, Brewer & Shipley, We Five, and Shango. His songs have been covered by Leon Russell, Herb Alpert, Kenny Loggins, Rita Coolidge, Meat Loaf, and others. Jerry also wrote various pieces for Hollywood TV shows and films.

Riopelle had a large and avid fan base in Arizona during the 1970s, highlighted by his annual New Year's Eve performances at Phoenix venue Celebrity Theatre, featuring a revolving stage. Well known national acts opened for Riopelle on these occasions, including The Dixie Dregs and others.

In 2001, Riopelle invented and patented the Beamz device for creating music using lasers.

He died of complications from cancer on December 24, 2018, at the age of 77.

Family
Riopelle and his wife Naomi had two children, daughter Angela and son Paul.  Jerry and Naomi
divided their time between homes in Scottsdale, Arizona, and Kailua-Kona, Hawaii.

Jerry and Paul were co-founders of the Beamz music system and served as company executives for beamz Interactive.

Discography

Albums (vinyl)
 Jerry Riopelle - Capitol ST-732 - 1971 
 Jerry Riopelle -(re issue) Capitol SM-732 - 1977 
 The Second Album - Capitol ST-863 - 1972 
 The Second Album -(re issue) Capitol SM-863 - 1977 
 Saving Grace - ABC ABCX-827 - 1974 
 Saving Grace -(Ariola Holland) ABC 27 205 ET - 1974 
 Take A Chance - ABC ABCD-886 - 1975 
 Take A Chance -(RCA Canada) - 1975 
 Little Bit At A Time - Little Eskimo 7 - 1977 
 In The Round - Little Eskimo 8 - 1978 
 In The Round - (Ariola Holland) - 1979 
 Dangerous Stranger - Little Eskimo 9 - 1979 
 Dangerous Stranger - (Ariola Holland) - 1979 
 Juicy Talk - Little Eskimo 10 - 1982 
 Livin’ The Life (UK import)- See For Miles SEE 70 - 1986

Cassettes
 Little Bit At A Time - Little Eskimo LE 7 - 1977 
 In The Round - Little Eskimo LE-C-8 - 1978 
 In The Round (2 extra songs)*-Little Eskimo LE-CX-8 - 1990 
 Dangerous Stranger - Little Eskimo LE 9 - 1979 
 Juicy Talk - Little Eskimo LE 10 - 1982 
 Hands On - Little Eskimo LE 11 - 1988 
 In The Blood* - Indio LE-CDX 1122 - 1998 
 Note these cassettes made especially for Celebrity Theater New Year shows.

CDs
 Hands On - Little Eskimo LECD 11 - 1986 
 In The Blood - Indio ICD-9303 - 1993 
 Hush Money - Mesa R2 79078 - 1994 
 Tongue 'n' Groove - Evening Star/Little Eskimo LE 2000 - 2000 
 Tongue 'n' Groove (+In The Round) - Evening Star/Little Eskimo LE 2000X - 2000 
 The Works 1970-2000 - Little Eskimo LE 2005 - 2005 
 In the Round-Deluxe - Little Eskimo LE 2009 - 2009

References

External links
 Jerry Riopelle Official Website

1940s births
2018 deaths
Year of birth missing
Musicians from Tampa, Florida
American rock musicians
Record producers from California
Businesspeople from Los Angeles
Musicians from Scottsdale, Arizona
Musicians from Detroit
20th-century American businesspeople